Antoniów  (German Antonia) is a village in the administrative district of Gmina Ozimek, within Opole County, Opole Voivodeship, in south-western Poland.

The village has a population of 1,227.

References

Villages in Opole County